Ivan Oleksiyovych Shmuratko (born December 21, 2001) is a Ukrainian figure skater. On the senior level is the 2018 Volvo Open Cup bronze medalist, 2018 Bosphorus Cup silver medalist, and four-time Ukrainian national champion (2019–22). On the junior level, he is the 2019 JGP Italy bronze medalist. He has competed in the final segment at two ISU Championships. Earlier in his career, he won silver in the team event at the 2016 Youth Olympics.

Career

Early years 
Shmuratko started learning to skate in 2006. In the 2014–15 season, he won bronze at the Ukrainian Junior Championships.

2015–16 season
Coached by Vira Volpova in Kyiv, Shmuratko won two junior international medals, gold at Ice Star and silver at the Santa Claus Cup. Competing on the senior level, he finished 4th at the Ukrainian national championships. He was named in Ukraine's team to the 2016 Winter Youth Olympics in Lillehammer. In Norway, he placed fourteenth in men's single skating and won a silver medal in the team event as a member of Team Future, which also included Diāna Ņikitina of Latvia, Anna Dušková / Martin Bidař of the Czech Republic, and Julia Wagret / Mathieu Couyras of France.

2018–19 season
Shmuratko opened his season on the ISU Junior Grand Prix series, placing 10th in Lithuania and 7th in Armenia. In November, making his senior international debut, he won bronze at the Volvo Open Cup in Latvia. The following month, he received medals at two senior events – silver at the Bosphorus Cup in Turkey and gold at the Ukrainian Championships. In January, he competed at his first ISU Championship, the 2019 European Championships in Minsk, Belarus. He qualified to the final segment and placed twenty-second overall. He also advanced to the free skate at the 2019 World Junior Championships, which took place in March in Zagreb. Ranked thirteenth in the short and seventeenth in the free, he finished sixteenth overall in Croatia.

2019–20 season
Shmuratko started his season on the ISU Junior Grand Prix series, placing seventh in Poland, and winning the bronze in Italy with a personal best score. In October, he competed at the Halloween Cup, winning the silver medal. In December, he won his second straight senior national title. He was named to the 2020 European Figure Skating Championships but withdrew. He placed fifteenth at the 2020 World Junior Figure Skating Championships. Shmuratko was assigned to compete at the World Championships in Montreal, but these were cancelled as a result of the coronavirus pandemic.

2020–21 season
With pandemic-related travel restrictions limiting where skaters could compete, Shmuratko began the season at a European-only 2020 CS Nebelhorn Trophy, where he placed twelfth. After winning his third consecutive Ukrainian national title, Shmuratko competed at the 2021 World Championships in Stockholm, placing twenty-first. His result qualified a men's berth for Ukraine at the 2022 Winter Olympics in Beijing.

2021–22 season
On the Challenger series, Shmuratko was fifth at the 2021 CS Denis Ten Memorial Challenge and seventeenth at the 2021 CS Warsaw Cup.  After winning the Ukrainian national title again, he was named to the Ukrainian Olympic team and placed twelfth at the 2022 European Championships.

Shmuratko tested positive for COVID-19 upon arrival in Beijing and so was unable to participate in the Olympic team event. He stated that he was asymptomatic and hoped to be cleared to compete in the later men's event. Shmuratko subsequently was allowed to resume competition, placing twenty-second in the short program to qualify to the free skate. He finished twenty-fourth overall.

Returning to Kyiv following the Olympics, Shmuratko soon found himself in the midst of Russia's invasion, with his home city being one of the largest points of conflict. Despite the war and the resultant limitations on his training, Shmurtako still traveled to attend the 2022 World Championships in Montpellier, a journey that took three days. He received a standing ovation from the crowd and qualified for the free program, ultimately finishing twenty-third overall. On his decision to attend, he said, "it's important for Ukraine to have athletes who represent it on the international scene."

2022–23 season 
Following the World Championships, Shmuratko spent April training at Club Olympique de Courbevoie in Paris, on the invitation of Ukrainian emigrant pair skater Denys Strekalin. He subsequently relocated his training base to Oberstdorf, Germany, adding coaches Michael Huth, Robert Dierking, and Anna Bernauer to his team. Beginning the season, he placed seventh and sixth at 2022 CS Nebelhorn Trophy and 2022 CS Finlandia Trophy. Before making his senior  Grand Prix debut at 2022 Grand Prix de France, Shmuratko once again relocated back to Courbevoie, France with Laurent Depouilly and Nathalie Depouilly becoming his coaches. He subsequently finished in eighth place at the Grand Prix de France after placing eighth in both the short program and free skate.

Programs

Competitive highlights 
CS: Challenger Series; JGP: Junior Grand Prix

Detailed results

Senior

Junior

References

External links 
 

2001 births
Ukrainian male single skaters
Living people
Sportspeople from Kyiv
Figure skaters at the 2016 Winter Youth Olympics
Figure skaters at the 2022 Winter Olympics
Olympic figure skaters of Ukraine